Havasupai may refer to: 

 Havasupai dialect, a dialect of the Upland Yuman language spoken by fewer than 450 people on the Havasupai Indian Reservation at the bottom of the Grand Canyon
 Havasupai people, an American Indian tribe that has called the Grand Canyon its home for at least the past 800 years
 Havasupai Trail, the main trail to Supai, Arizona and to Havasu Falls
 Havasupai–Hualapai language, the Native American language spoken by the Hualapai (Walapai) and Havasupai peoples